Hall of Waters, also known as Siloam Park and Springs, is a historic building located at Excelsior Springs, Clay County, Missouri. It is currently the City Hall of Exceisor Springs. It is the site of the first spring of many discovered in Excelsior Springs in the 1880s and 1890s. It was built as a mineral water health resort, with mineral baths and water bottling plant, capturing water from the springs.

It was designed by the architectural firm Keene & Simpson and built in 1936-37 as Public Works Administration Project #5252.  It is a five-level, reinforced concrete "T"-shaped building with strong Art Deco and Depression Modern features.  It features a decorative boiler stack tower with cast stone and an aluminum cap 30 feet high.  

It was listed on the National Register of Historic Places in 1983.  It is located in the Excelsior Springs Hall of Waters Commercial East Historic District. In 2020, the National Trust for Historic Preservation named it as one of America's most endangered historic places.  It is currently used as city offices and has a visitor center.

References

Public Works Administration in Missouri
PWA Moderne architecture
Individually listed contributing properties to historic districts on the National Register in Missouri
Buildings and structures on the National Register of Historic Places in Missouri
Art Deco architecture in Missouri
Modernist architecture in Missouri
Buildings and structures completed in 1934
Buildings and structures in Clay County, Missouri
National Register of Historic Places in Clay County, Missouri
1934 establishments in Missouri